Hess Mesa is a small mesa that surmounts the divide between Koenig Valley and Mudrey Cirque in the Asgard Range of Victoria Land, Antarctica.

References

Mesas of Antarctica
Landforms of Victoria Land
McMurdo Dry Valleys